Four Wives  is a 1939 American drama film starring the Lane Sisters (Priscilla Lane, Rosemary Lane, Lola Lane) and Gale Page. The film was directed by Michael Curtiz and is based on the story "Sister Act" by Fannie Hurst. The supporting cast features Claude Rains, Jeffrey Lynn, Eddie Albert, Frank McHugh and Dick Foran. The picture is a sequel to Four Daughters (1938) and was followed by Four Mothers (1941).  Four Wives was released by Warner Bros. on December 25, 1939.

Plot
Ann Lemp Borden has been recently widowed, after her husband Mickey Borden, a down-and-out and unlucky musical genius, is tragically killed in a car accident. She now lives at home again with her father, Aunt Etta and younger sister Kay. Her two other sisters Emma and Thea are married.

Kay is dating young doctor Clint Forrest Jr., and Emma and Thea wish to have children. Ann, engaged to musical composer Felix Dietz, suddenly discovers that she is pregnant with her deceased husband's child. Unable to forget Mickey, she is unsure about marrying Felix. A flashback shows Mickey playing an unfinished musical composition “that has only a middle…no beginning…no ending” and Ann frequently replays the tune in her head or on her piano. Ann is distressed over the raw deal that life has dealt to Mickey. Felix eventually convinces Ann to marry him and they elope, but Ann is still caught up in the past tragedy. Felix finishes Mickey's composition and conducts it nationally on radio, making a speech commemorating Mickey's genius and untimely death.

Convinced now that Mickey Borden did not die in vain, Ann comes back to reality, rediscovers her love for Felix and, together with her family, goes on to have a normal, happy life complete with her child, nieces and nephews.

Cast

 Priscilla Lane as Ann Lemp Dietz
 Rosemary Lane as Kay Lemp
 Lola Lane as Thea Lemp Crowley
 Gale Page as Emma Lemp Talbot
 Claude Rains as Adam Lemp
 Jeffrey Lynn as Felix Dietz
 Eddie Albert as Clint Forrest, Jr.
 May Robson as Aunt Etta
 Frank McHugh as Ben Crowley
 Dick Foran as Ernest Talbot
 Henry O'Neill as Clinton Forrest, Sr.
 John Garfield as Mickey Borden
 Vera Lewis as Mrs. Ridgefield
 John Qualen as Frank

Reception
Critic Frank Nugent of The New York Times wrote: "Sequels so rarely even approximate the quality of their originals that the Warners deserve a special word of commendation this morning for their 'Four Wives,' the Strand's inevitable aftermath to the 'Four Daughters' which appeared on most of the ten-best lists last year. For it is a singularly happy film, well-written, well-directed and well-played, and it reconciles us tranquilly to the vista it has opened of a 'Four Mothers' (although part of that already has been realized), a 'Four Grandmothers' and possibly a 'Four Granddaughters.' The film runs its course entertainingly, making its little jokes about fatherhood, having its fun with the new matrimonial prospect's introduction to the family, regaining its dignity in the moments devoted to consideration of the posthumous problem child. The old cast has been assembled again: the Lane sisters, Gale Page, Claude Rains, May Robson, Frank McHugh, Dick Foran and Mr. Lynn; John Garfield appears briefly as the ghost of his former proud self, and Eddie Albert is the new young man, a young doctor with a high opinion of Pasteur and Ehrlich (both being Warner productions). A pleasant family reunion all around, in fact, being a tribute not merely to the Lemps but to the Lane sisters who play it, to the Epstein brothers who have written it, and to the Warners who have produced it."

Home media
Warner Archive released Four Wives on DVD on August 1, 2011. The film was also released by Warner Archive in the Four Daughters Movie Series Collection.

References

External links
 
 
 
 

1939 films
1939 drama films
American black-and-white films
American sequel films
1930s English-language films
Films about families
Films directed by Michael Curtiz
Films scored by Max Steiner
Warner Bros. films
Films based on works by Fannie Hurst
American drama films
1930s American films